Robert Lee Gavin (May 22, 1916 – June 11, 1981) was an American attorney and politician.

Early life and education 
Robert Gavin was born on May 22, 1916 in Roseboro, North Carolina, United States to Edward Lee Gavin and Mary Caudle Gavin. Soon thereafter his family moved to Sanford, where he attended public schools. He received a bachelor's degree from the University of North Carolina at Chapel Hill in 1936 and returned to Sanford to establish a timber business. After the outbreak of World War II, Gavin left Sanford to serve in the United States Army Coast Artillery Corps for one year, reaching the rank of corporal. After the war Gavin finished his education at the University of North Carolina School of Law and was admitted to the North Carolina State Bar in 1946. He married Grace McNiell Blue in 1947 and had three children with her.

Career 
After receiving his law degree, Gavin returned to Sanford and practiced with the family firm of Gavin, Jackson, and Gavin. He served as a delegate to the Republican Party's national conventions in 1948, 1960, and 1964. In 1954 he was appointed Assistant United States District Attorney for the Middle District of North Carolina. In 1957 he was made United States District Attorney for the Middle District, temporarily filling in a vacancy created by the departure of his predecessor. In 1958 he left the post to resume private legal practice.

In 1960 Gavin, a Republican, ran to become Governor of North Carolina in 1960. He faced Democrat Terry Sanford in the general election. Gavin denounced Sanford as a tool of the liberal leadership of the national Democratic Party and organized labor. He identified himself as a conservative but denied being a reactionary. He called for a "fusion" of Democratic and Republican voters to support his candidacy, and promised to institute a civil service system to reduce the amount of patronage available to state politicians. Though he said he would not make race an issue of his campaign, he criticized the national Democratic Party's support for civil rights. He lost the gubernatorial race, 613,975 votes to Sanford's 735,258 votes, but performed better than other Republican gubernatorial candidates had in preceding years. In 1962 he became Chairman of the North Carolina Republican Party, holding the post until the following year. Gavin initially announced that he would not seek the Republican nomination for the 1964 North Carolina gubernatorial election, but changed his mind at the state Republican convention and accepted the nomination that year after being urged to do so by his colleagues. He lost the general election to Democrat Dan K. Moore, earning 606,165 votes to Moore's 790,343 votes. Attributing the defeat to a lack of black electoral support, he urged the Republican Party to reach out to black voters, though he opposed the Civil Rights Act of 1964.

Gavin served as the city attorney of Sanford from 1965 to 1971, when he left the city and moved to 
Pinehurst. He served on the North Carolina State Constitution Study Commission in 1968. In 1972 and 1973 he acted as a civilian aide to the Secretary of the Army. Republican Governor James Holshouser appointed him as a special judge on the North Carolina Superior Court in 1974. He was sworn-in on January 6, 1975. Holshouser's successor, Democrat Jim Hunt, reappointed Gavin to the post, and in 1980 he supported Hunt's reelection. He retired from the judgeship that year.

Later life 
After leaving his judicial office, Gavin practiced law at the firm of Staton, Gavin, and Perkinson. He began receiving chemotherapy to treat liver cancer in early 1981. He died on June 11, 1981 at his home in Pinehurst.

References

Works cited 
 
 
  - Read online
  - See profile at Google Books
 

1916 births
1981 deaths
North Carolina Republicans
University of North Carolina School of Law alumni
United States Attorneys for the Middle District of North Carolina
North Carolina lawyers
State political party chairs of North Carolina
20th-century American lawyers